FranKo are an English pop/rock/alternative band from South London, England. The group consists of Tommy Bastow (Lead Singer), Richard Craker (vocals/guitars), Chris Gilbertson (Bass/backing vocals) and Richard "Ricky" Rayner on the Drums.

2011 saw them enter the inaugural Online Music Awards, where they were the only entrants selected as finalists in 2 categories by an industry panel. They won 'Best Rock Act 2011' as voted by the public. The second category was 'Best international Unsigned'.

History
'FranKo' are a young, pop-rock band from South London. Their blistering live style is matched by their unique, savvy songwriting and sharp looks. Having already made their mark, the 4 piece has achieved plenty – playing for London's City Showcase, touring in Thailand, taking their live show to NYC and supporting Elliot Minor on their Solaris UK national tour.

Hard working and naturally charismatic, they are currently putting together the finishing touches for their latest collection of songs, which finds them realising a compelling new sound. They have just completed two tours of the UK (supporting ROOM 94, then Dave Giles) and just before that returned from Music Matters in Singapore (and a sold-out show in Bangkok) where they were lauded as one of THE bands to see at the festival. During Music Matters, FRANKO contributed performances to international charitable single 'Fix You' by Music Matters For Japan – which is out now.
Their international and home-grown fanbases continue to swell as more and more towns and territories latch onto their distinctive sound. Fan pages have been springing up all over, including those in the US, Canada, France, Germany, Holland, Australia, Malaysia, Singapore, Mexico, Chile, Uruguay, Argentina – and the guys make sure they service their fans diligently, and with the respect they deserve.

Earlier in the year, FRANKO were nominated as finalists in two categories at the inaugural St Helier Cider Online Music Awards: Best Rock Act 2011 & Best International Unsigned – and winning Best Rock Act.

December will see them playing to a potential 100,000 people over 6 days at Birmingham's NEC, where they are the only live band appearing at the Clothes Show Live event, lining up alongside acts like Alexandra Burke and Parade. And January 2012 sees them looking to take their live show to the Asian market, including a slot supporting Incubus in Thailand.

On 29 March 2013, FranKo announced on their Facebook page they were going on a break to re-invent themselves.

Discography
Albums

Singles

Band members
Tommy Bastow – lead vocals (2007–present)
Richard Craker – guitar, vocals (2007–present)
Christopher Ian Gilbertson – bass, backing vocals (2007–present)
Richard 'Ricky' Rayner – drums (2011–present)
Beau Poynts – drums (2007–2011)

References

External links

English alternative rock groups
Musical groups from London